The Ministry of Public Administration (abbreviated as MoPa) is primarily responsible for management of public administration in Bangladesh. 
Present minister is Sheikh Hasina Wazed and Minister of State is Farhad Hossain. 
Present Senior secretary is K M Ali Azam.

Directorate
Bangladesh Employees Welfare Board (BKKB)
Bangladesh Public Administration Training Centre (BPATC)
Bangladesh Public Service Commission
Bangladesh Civil Service Administration Academy
BIAM Foundation
Department of Printing and Publications
Government Transport Directorate

References

External links 
 

 
Education
Public administration
Internal affairs ministries